Glenn Scott Cameron (born February 21, 1953) is an American former college and professional football player who was a linebacker in the National Football League (NFL) for eleven seasons during the 1970s and 1980s.  Cameron played college football for the University of Florida, and thereafter, he played professionally for the Cincinnati Bengals of the NFL.

Early life 

Cameron was born in Miami, Florida in 1953.  He attended Coral Gables Senior High School in Coral Gables, Florida, and he was a star high school football player for the Coral Gables Cavaliers.

College career 

Cameron accepted an athletic scholarship to attend the University of Florida in Gainesville, Florida, where he played linebacker for coach Doug Dickey's Florida Gators football team from 1971 to 1974.  Cameron was a first-team All-Southeastern Conference (SEC) selection and an Associated Press third-team All-American in 1974.

Cameron graduated from the University of Florida with a bachelor's degree in management in 1976, and returned to earn a J.D. degree in 1987.  He was inducted into the University of Florida Athletic Hall of Fame as a "Gator Great" in 1984.  The sportswriters of The Gainesville Sun ranked him as one of the 100 greatest Gators (No. 43) of the first century of Florida football in 2006.

Professional career 

During his eleven-season career with the Bengals, he played in 159 games, started in eighty-four of them, intercepted five passes, and recovered three fumbles.

Life after the NFL 

Cameron is now a practicing, board certified trial lawyer and partner in the law firm of Cameron & Marroney PLLC, in West Palm Beach, Florida.

See also 

 Florida Gators football, 1970–79
 History of the Cincinnati Bengals
 List of Florida Gators football All-Americans
 List of Florida Gators in the NFL Draft
 List of Levin College of Law graduates
 List of University of Florida alumni
 List of University of Florida Athletic Hall of Fame members

References

Bibliography 

 Carlson, Norm, University of Florida Football Vault: The History of the Florida Gators, Whitman Publishing, LLC, Atlanta, Georgia (2007).  .
 Golenbock, Peter, Go Gators!  An Oral History of Florida's Pursuit of Gridiron Glory, Legends Publishing, LLC, St. Petersburg, Florida (2002).  .
 Hairston, Jack, Tales from the Gator Swamp: A Collection of the Greatest Gator Stories Ever Told, Sports Publishing, LLC, Champaign, Illinois (2002).  .
 McCarthy, Kevin M.,  Fightin' Gators: A History of University of Florida Football, Arcadia Publishing, Mount Pleasant, South Carolina (2000).  .
 McEwen, Tom, The Gators: A Story of Florida Football, The Strode Publishers, Huntsville, Alabama (1974).  .
 Nash, Noel, ed., The Gainesville Sun Presents The Greatest Moments in Florida Gators Football, Sports Publishing, Inc., Champaign, Illinois (1998).  .

1953 births
Living people
Coral Gables Senior High School alumni
American football linebackers
Cincinnati Bengals players
Florida Gators football players
Florida lawyers
Sportspeople from Coral Gables, Florida
Fredric G. Levin College of Law alumni
Players of American football from Miami